Wilbur McKee White (February 22, 1890 – December 31, 1973) was an American politician and World War I veteran who served one term as a U.S. Representative from Ohio from 1931 to 1933.

Biography
Born near Hillsboro, Ohio, White was educated in the rural schools and the Hillsboro High School.
Marietta College, (Ohio) College, M.A., 1914.
He engaged in teaching at Marietta, Ohio, in 1914 and 1915.
Correspondent for a Dayton, Ohio, newspaper in 1916.
He served in the United States Army on the Mexican border as a private and first sergeant in Company H, Third Ohio Infantry, in 1916.
During the First World War served from August 15, 1917, as a first lieutenant and later as a captain in the Three Hundred and Thirty-second Regiment, United States Infantry, in Italy and France.
Associated with the Toledo Times in 1919 and served as managing editor 1925-1930 and associate editor in 1930 and 1931.

Congress 
White was elected as a Republican to the Seventy-second Congress (March 4, 1931 – March 3, 1933).
He was an unsuccessful candidate for reelection in 1932 and for election in 1940 to the Seventy-seventh Congress.

Later career and death 
He was employed in a glass manufacturing concern in 1933.
He served as secretary and as executive director of the Safety Glass Association 1934-1958.
He engaged in independent highway safety work 1958-1961.
He died in Chillicothe, Ohio, December 31, 1973.
He was interred in Hillsboro Cemetery, Hillsboro, Ohio.

Sources

1890 births
1973 deaths
People from Hillsboro, Ohio
United States Army officers
Marietta College alumni
United States Army personnel of World War I
20th-century American politicians
Toledo Maroons players
Republican Party members of the United States House of Representatives from Ohio